The Salzungen Werra Upland is a natural region in Germany that forms part of the East Hesse Highlands in the German states of Hesse and Thuringia.

Location 
The Salzungen Werra Upland lies on either side of the Werra near Bad Salzungen. It accompanies the River Werra on both sides from Walldorf to Vacha, continuing on its right bank only as far as Gerstungen.

Geology 
The upland's main rock is bunter sandstone, from which emerge several, less volcanic kuppen like the Pleß and Stoffelskuppe, whose phenotype presages the Kuppen Rhön that lies to the west. Salt tectonics have resulted in hollows and sinkholes.

Natural regions 
The Salzungen Werra Upland is a major natural region unit (no. 359) within the major unit group of the East Hesse Highlands (number 35 or D47). The valleys of the Werra and Suhl, which mainly run in a northwesterly direction, divide the upland into 3 orographic mountain regions, of which only the central Frauensee Hills (Frauenseer Hügelland) are independent.

359 Salzungen Werra Upland (Salzunger Werrabergland)
 359.0 Stadtlengsfeld Hill Country (Stadtlengsfelder Hügelland)
 359.00 Eastern Slopes of the Kuppen Rhön (Ostabdachung der Kuppenrhön) (inter alia with the Pleß and Stoffelskuppe as well as the lower reaches of the Felda)
 359.01 Lower Ulster valley (Unteres Ulstertal)
 359.1 Salzungen-Herleshausen Werra Valley (Salzungen-Herleshausener Werratal)
 359.10 Salzungen Basin (Salzunger Becken)
 359.11 Dorndorf-Heringen Werra Valley (Dorndorf-Heringer-Werratal)
 359.12 Berka Basin (Berkaer Becken)
 359.13 Neustädt-Hörschel Werra Valley (Neustädt-Hörscheler Werratal)
 359.2 Frauenseer Hill Country (Frauenseer Hügelland)
 359.3 Suhl-Fischgraben Valleys
 359.4 Oberelle Hill Country (Obereller Hügelland)

Mountains and hills 
Among the mountains and hills of the Salzungen Werra Upland are the following − with heights in metres above sea level (NN):

Rivers and streams 
Among the rivers and streams (all in the Werra catchment) of the Salzungen Werra Upland are the following (downstream from south to north, with lengths in kilometres and mouth locations):

References

External links 
 BfN landscape fact files
 Salzungen Werra Upland less Werra valley
 Werraaue Meiningen-Wartha (just extends beyond the Salzungen Werra Upland to the south)

Central Uplands
Mountain ranges of Thuringia
Forests and woodlands of Thuringia
! Salzungen Werra Upland